Ismet Hazir Asllani (August 18, 1955 – March 24, 1999) was a businessman, humanitarian and logistic commander. 
Asllani had during the Kosovo War the responsibility for the brigade 153 of the Kosovo Liberation Army (abbreviated KLA; Albanian: Ushtria Çlirimtare e Kosovës—UÇK), which was an ethnic-Albanian paramilitary organisation that fought for the secession of Kosovo from the Federal Republic of Yugoslavia (FRY) during the 1990s and the eventual creation of a Greater Albania.

Biography
Asllani was born in the village of Prapashticë, in the Goljak Highlands of Pristina, Kosovo, to Hazir and Emine Asllani.

Ismet Asllani is the founder and former CEO of the "Fabrika e Miellit Prapashtica" flour factory.
The economic wealth the Family Asllani achieved in the 1980–90s was obtained from hard work within the family's flour and wheat fabrics located in respectively Lipjan, Kijevë and Kopernicë.

During the most difficult times of the Yugoslav regime, the Family Asllani fed the KLA and a large part of the Kosovo-Albanian population with food.
Ismet Asllani supported also financially the knowledge and education system in Kosovo by awarding scholarships to hundreds of Albanian students to educate in western universities. 
Due to the occupation of the Albanian schools in Kosovo by the Serbs, Ismet Asllani's house, which is located close to the centrum of Prishtina became an important place and service for the students of the faculty of medicine.

On March 24, 1999, when NATO started airstrikes against Yugoslav targets, Ismet Asllani was shot in the village of Konjuh after a highly planned and organised action from the Special forces of Serbia.

Approximately, one month later on April 19, Ismet's two younger brothers, Muharrem and Nazim Asllani got shot by the Yugoslav police in the village Hallaq i Vogël (Serbian: Mali Alaš).

Ismet Asllani's sons, Alban and Valon Asllani took also part in the KLA.

On February 16, 2013, the President of the Republic of Kosovo,  Atifete Jahjaga, at a special ceremony, awarded Ismet Asllani the Order of "Hero of Kosovo".

References

Notes 

1955 births
1999 deaths
Kosovo Liberation Army soldiers